The word Ulloa in the world mostly comes as a gentilic from A Ulloa (and itself from the Ulla River) in Galicia, Spain, later expanded all over the world by emigration and American conquest, and may refer to:

Maritime
 Spanish cruiser Don Antonio de Ulloa,  Velasco-class cruiser

Natural history
 Turbonilla ulloa, species of sea snail

Places 
 A Ulloa, region in Galicia, Spain
 Twin Islands (British Columbia), Canada, formerly known as the Ulloa Islands
 Ulloa, Valle del Cauca, municipality in Colombia
 Ulloa Street, a street name in New Orleans, Louisiana

Persons with the surname
 Antonio de Ulloa (1716–1795), Spanish general, explorer, author, astronomer, colonial administrator
 Augusto Ulloa y Castañón (1823–1879), Spanish lawyer, politician, journalist
 Berny Ulloa Morera (born 1950), Costa Rican football referee
 Carlos Ramírez Ulloa (1903–1980), Mexican civil engineer
 Cynthia Calderón (born 1988), Peruvian model
 Edward Ulloa (born 1962), American attorney, criminal prosecutor
 Emilio Ulloa (born 1952), Chilean long-distance runner
 Fabio Ulloa (born 1976), Honduran footballer
 Félix Ulloa (born 1951), Vice President of El Salvador 
 Fernando Cepeda Ulloa (born 1938), Colombian political scientist, professor, diplomat
 Francisco Ulloa (accordionist), Dominican Republic accordionist
 Francisco de Ulloa (died 1540), Spanish explorer
 Gerardo Ulloa Pérez (born 1965), Mexican politician
 Hilario Ulloa, Nicaraguan politician
 Ignacio Ulloa Rubio (born 1967), Spanish judge
 Jose Domingo Ulloa Mendieta (born 1956), Panamanian clergy
 José Francisco Ulloa (born 1940), Costa Rican clergy
 Juanma Bajo Ulloa (born 1967), Spanish Basque film director
 Leonardo Ulloa (born 1986), Argentine footballer
 Manuel Ulloa Elías (1922–1992), Peruvian politician, economist
 Óscar Ulloa (born 1986), Salvadoran footballer
 Pedro Osores de Ulloa (1554–1624), Spanish Governor of Chile
 Ricardo Ulloa (born 1990), Salvadoran footballer
 Roberto Ulloa (1924–2020), Argentinian politician
 Rudy Ulloa (born 1960), Argentinian politician, businessman, media entrepreneur
 Tristán Ulloa (born 1970), Spanish actor, writer, director
 Victor Ulloa (footballer, born 1992) (born 1992), American footballer
 Víctor Ulloa (Peruvian footballer) (born 1991), Peruvian footballer

Galician-language surnames